Regresó el Jefe (in English, The Boss is Back) is the sixth studio album by Elvis Crespo that was released to the public on June 5, 2007.  It is Crespo's first album in three years.

The album features special appearances by fellow Puerto Rican merengue singer Giselle, and Dominican singers Los Hermanos Rosario. Also, the first single - "La Foto se me Borró" - features the vocals of a new merengue group produced by Crespo called Zone D'Tambora.

The song "Échate Pa'Cá" was the song that Puerto Rican group Grupo Manía (Crespo's previous group) popularized after Crespo briefly rejoined the group for a tour entitled The Originals.

Track listing 
All songs written by E. Crespo, except where noted.
 "20 Aky"
 "La Foto Se Me Borró"(E. Crespo, Zone D' Tambora)
 "Con el Tiempo y un Ganchito"
 "Bambaribiri"(E. Crespo, ñejo)
 "Llore y Llore"
 "Tala Tala"
 "Mi Fracaso"
 "Los Caminos de la Vida" (E. Crespo, Los Hermanos Rosario)
 "Ito Ito Bonito"
 "Te Veo Triste" (E. Crespo, Gisselle)
 "Así Es La Vida"
 "Échate Pa'Cá" (E. Crespo, Grupo Manía)
 "La Foto Se Me Borró" (Bachata Mix)(E. Crespo, Zone D' Tambora)

References 

Elvis Crespo albums
2007 albums
Machete Music albums